Akiko Matsuura (also known by the name Keex) is a Japanese drummer and vocalist residing in the United Kingdom. She has worked in numerous bands in the U.K.

Career
Matsuura is the front woman of the English art rock band PRE. Matsuura has worked with numerous bands, as the front woman for Comanechi, along with guitarist, Simon Petrovich.  Matsuura played drums with The Big Pink, and has a side project called Sperm Javelin.

Matsuura met her partners in The Big Pink while attending art school in London; they were all well known in the London punk and noise rock scene. She has also played with the Glasgow band, Divorce.

Personal life
Matsuura formerly dated English actor Charlie Heaton. The two share a son who was born in 2014.

See also
 Women in punk rock

References

Living people
Japanese drummers
Japanese emigrants to the United Kingdom
Women drummers
Place of birth missing (living people)
Year of birth missing (living people)